Bring 'Em Out may refer to:
 "Bring Em Out" (song), a song by rapper T.I.
 Bring 'Em Out Live, an album by rock band FireHouse
 Bring 'Em Out, an EP and song by pop punk band Hawk Nelson